Piazzatorre is a comune (municipality) in the Province of Bergamo in the Italian region of Lombardy, located about  northeast of Milan and about  north of Bergamo.

Piazzatorre borders the following municipalities: Branzi, Isola di Fondra, Mezzoldo, Moio de' Calvi, Olmo al Brembo, Piazzolo, Valleve.

Tourism 

In the territory of Piazzotorre exists the ski area of Torcole.

The first upper-class Milanese tourists began to arrive in Piazzotorre at the beginning of the 20th century. Until the 1940s of the past century there was only summer tourism but due to the development of the Torcole Ski Area, winter tourism began in Piazzatorre.

Demographic evolution

References